Party til You Puke is the second EP released by Andrew W.K. in October 2000. It is an electronic-based album, unlike its guitar based predecessor, AWKGOJ. It was initially released on vinyl by Bulb Records, later being released on CD in the United States by Bulb Records as well as Academy Records (a record label established just for the release by Bulb founder Pete Larson) and in Japan by P-Vine Records.

Track listings

Vinyl
 "Party til You Puke"
 "Party til You Puke (Remix)"
 "Party til You Puke (Shout Out Remix)"
 "Old Man (Couch Cover)"
 "Dance Party (Anti-Never Ending Music Mix)"
 "I Want to Kill (Build-It-Up Club Mix)"

CD
 "Party til You Puke"
 "Party til You Puke (Remix)"
 "Party til You Puke (Shout Out Remix)"
 "Dance Party (Anti-Never Ending Music Mix)"
 "I Want to Kill (Build-It-Up Club Mix)"
 "Old Man (Couch Cover)"

The mixes of some of the songs on the CD are considerably longer than that on the vinyl.

Trivia
 Some of the tracks on the vinyl release are significantly shorter than the tracks on the CD versions.
 "Party til You Puke" was re-recorded and included on Andrew's first album, I Get Wet.
 "Dance Party" was re-worked into the song "Long Live the Party" for Andrew's second album; The Wolf.
 The original pressing of the vinyl version of this EP came with an insert.
 Andrew's first full-length release, according to the Bulb Records website as of the year 2000, was supposed to contain all of the tracks on this EP, plus 10 other tracks, which were to be remixes and brand new tracks. It was supposed to be in CD format, and only 1000 copies were to be pressed. This plan was ultimately scrapped, and some of the tracks that were to be on the album went on to be included on Andrew's first and second major-label albums, I Get Wet and The Wolf.
 It was planned at one point in time that some of the tracks on this EP were to be incorporated into Andrew's second major label album, The Wolf.

Personnel
Andrew W.K. – vocals, keyboards
Tony Allen – drums, electronic drums
Jeff Holmes – keyboards, programming

References

External links

2000 EPs
Andrew W.K. albums
P-Vine Records albums
2000 remix albums